Miklós Forrai (19 October 1913 – 27 December 1998) was a Hungarian conductor, choir director and music professor. In 1980, Forrai received the Robert Schumann Prize of the City of Zwickau.

Training 
Born in Magyarszék, in addition to his high school education, Forrai studied piano and music composition at the Városi Zenede, the music school of the city of Debrecen. From 1931 he studied trumpet at the Franz Liszt Academy of Music in Budapest, then stayed two years at the church music department and another year as a choir director. He received a certificate as a singing teacher. In 1935 Zoltán Kodály accepted him into his composition class, directly into the third academic year.

References

External links 
 
 
 

Hungarian conductors (music)
Male conductors (music)
Hungarian choral conductors
1913 births
1998 deaths
Members of the Hungarian Academy of Sciences
Artists of Merit of the Hungarian People's Republic
20th-century Hungarian male musicians